The Mount Baker Theatre (officially abbreviated MBT) is a 1,517-seat performing arts venue and national historic landmark in Bellingham, Washington. The theater hosts professional productions and concerts as well as community performances from the north of Puget Sound. The theater's main stage is the largest theatrical venue in Washington north of Seattle's Paramount and 5th Avenue.

The Mount Baker Theatre was designed by architect Robert Reamer (who also designed Seattle's 5th Avenue Theatre) in a Moorish–Spanish style. Popular legend holds that the building is haunted by a ghost named Judy. The facility is owned by the city of Bellingham and managed by the nonprofit Mount Baker Theatre organization, headed by president Gary Barnett and executive director Brad Burdick.

Facility
The Mount Baker Theatre occupies half a city block. It has three distinct facilities for concerts, live theater, films, receptions, and other events. All public facilities, except the balcony, are fully ADA accessible. Some non-public facilities, such as backstage and storage spaces, may not be accessible.

Main Theater 
The main theater contains large stage facing floor and balcony seating. Using the main floor and balcony, seating capacity is 1,517 people. An orchestra pit sits five feet below the stage and can hold 25 musicians. The theater has a professional lighting and sound system, a large movie screen and projection room, and a historic pipe organ.

Encore Room 
The Encore Room is a  reception hall or meeting space in the southern portion of the theater. It can accommodate 120 people in standard seating and 60-80 seated at tables. A kitchen is adjacent to the room.

Walton Theater 
The Walton Theatre is named in honor of Harold and Irene Walton. It is a smaller performance space west of the main theater. There are attached restrooms and a kitchen.

Events
The Mount Baker Theatre hosts a variety events including live theater, concerts, movies, arts festivals, and comedy shows.

Architecture

History
The Mount Baker Theater was built in 1927 to provide entertainment for a growing city. It was designed by architect Robert Reamer. Originally, it held live theater and concerts. A screen was added later to show silent movies.

The theater was in a historic part of downtown. Bellingham's Carnegie library was just south of the theater. The Bellingham Tower stands tall to the theater's west. The tower was built as a luxurious hotel; it is an office building with a café at street level. At 15 stories, it is the tallest building in Bellingham and Whatcom County. The original City Hall, built in 1891, stands two blocks west of the theater and is home to the Whatcom Museum. The Bellingham Bank Building, Federal Building, and Crown Plaza are within a few blocks to the southeast.

Ghost

For decades, theater staff have reported unusual phenomena, which has led to an urban legend of a ghost. In August 2010, paranormal investigators, affiliated with the Syfy Channel's show Ghost Hunters, and psychics spent a night in the theater to find evidence of paranormal activity.

References

External links
Mount Baker Theatre official site
Mount Baker Theatre Organ Society
Whatcom Symphony Orchestra

Buildings and structures in Bellingham, Washington
Theatres on the National Register of Historic Places in Washington (state)
Robert Reamer buildings
Moorish Revival architecture in Washington (state)
Spanish Revival architecture in Washington (state)
Theatres completed in 1927
Tourist attractions in Bellingham, Washington
National Register of Historic Places in Whatcom County, Washington
Public venues with a theatre organ